The Vale of Rest (1858–1859) is a painting by John Everett Millais. It depicts a twilight graveyard scene and prominently features two nuns.

Subject
The painting is of a graveyard, as night is coming on. Beyond the graveyard wall there is a low chapel with a bell. In the foreground of the scene, there are two nuns – the heads of the two nuns are level and symmetrical. There is no evidence that they are Roman Catholic nuns. Many of the Pre-Raphaelite Brotherhood would have known of the growing Anglican sisterhoods, some of whose sisters joined Catholic Sisters with Florence Nightingale on her mission to the Crimea.  One of the nuns holds a rosary, and one of the nuns is digging a grave. Her forearm and body strain under the weight of a shovelful of earth. The other, overseeing the work, turns with a look of apprehension and anguish.

Reception
Art critic Tom Lubbock said of the painting:"Graves. Dusk. A walled enclosure. The spooky, looming trees. Nuns. Catholics (in England then, still an object of suspicion). Sexual segregation. Religiosity. Mistress and servant, a power relationship, maybe some deeper emotional bondage. Female labour. Something being buried or exhumed. Twin wreaths. The deep dark earth. Corpses, secrets, conspiracy, fear. It's a picture that pulls out all the stops."

The painting is one of those satirised in Florence Claxton's watercolour The Choice of Paris – an idyll (1860). Claxton criticized "the perceived ugliness of early pre-Raphaelite paintings by exaggerating details from many of their works, including The Vale of Rest, Claudio and Isabella, and, lying in the grass, Alice Gray from Spring"

References

Paintings by John Everett Millais
1858 paintings
1859 paintings
Paintings about death